Toni Claudette Antonucci (born September 9, 1948) is an American psychologist, currently the Elizabeth R. Douvan Collegiate Professor at University of Michigan and formerly President of Gerontological Society of America Her husband was James S. Jackson.

Antonucci studies social relations at all stages throughout the life span.   (infancy, childhood, adolescence, adulthood, and old age).  She strongly criticizes the practice of mandatory retirement found in many countries, regarding it as ageism and discriminatory.

References

1948 births
Living people
University of Michigan faculty
American women psychologists
21st-century American psychologists
Wayne State University alumni
American women academics
21st-century American women
20th-century American psychologists